Superposition may refer to:

Science and mathematics 
 Law of superposition in geology and archaeology, which states that sedimentary layers are deposited in a time sequence, with the oldest on the bottom and the youngest on the top
 Superposition calculus, used in logic for equational first-order reasoning
 Superposition principle in physics and engineering, asserting the linearity of many physical systems, including:
 Superposition theorem for electric circuits
 Superposition of gravitational potentials
 Dalton's law of partial pressures, superposition in fluid mechanics
 Quantum superposition, in quantum physics
 In chemistry, a property of two structures that have the same chirality
 In Euclidean geometry, the principle of superposition is a method of proof
 The Kolmogorov–Arnold superposition theorem, representing a multivariate function as a superposition of univariate functions

Music and art 
 Superposition (EP), 2002 album by the band Kling Klang
 "Superposition", a song by Young the Giant from the 2018 album Mirror Master
"Superposition", a song by Daniel Caesar from the 2019 album Case Study 01
 In music theory, "reaching over"

See also
 Superimposition (disambiguation)
 Overlay (disambiguation)
 Overlap (disambiguation)